SOR NB12 is a fully low-floor single-decker bus produced by the Czech bus manufacturer SOR from the Czech Republic since 2008. In many towns they currently replace Karosa B 731, Karosa B 732 and Karosa B 931.

Construction features 
SOR NB12 is derived from SOR NB 18 articulated single-decker bus. Engine and automatic transmission are located in the left rear corner of the bus. Inside are used plastic Ster seats. Rear axle is VOITH brand and the front axle is own production with independent wheel suspension. Only rear axle is propulsed. Body of the vehicle is welded from steel-voltage profiles, flashings from the outside and interior are lined with plastic sheeting. The floor of the bus is at a height of 360 mm above the ground. On the right side of the bus are four doors (first are narrower than other doors).

In Czech Republic are also produced trolleybuses SOR TNB 12 and Škoda 30Tr SOR in Škoda Transportation, which are based on SOR NB 12 bodies.

Production and operation 
In 2006 SOR introduced in Brno on Autotec a completely new range of low-floor buses. Standard bus NB 12 and articulated NB 18 were presented with their prototype after the prototypes has done both test drive through cities in Czech Republic and Slovakia. The second bus type NB 18 was introduced at Autotec 2008 and from first prototype it differs with modified design. Serial production began in the fall of 2008.

See also 

 Photos of second prototype

External links
 Description on the web page of manufacturer

 List of buses

Buses of the Czech Republic
Buses manufactured by SOR
Low-floor buses
Trolleybuses
Vehicles introduced in 2008